John Abbott King (21 August 1883 – 9 August 1916) was an English rugby union player who won 12 caps as a number 8 between 1911 and 1913. During World War I he served as a lance corporal with the King's Liverpool Regiment, and was killed at the Battle of the Somme aged 32. He is one of the missing commemorated on the Thiepval Memorial.

References

1883 births
1916 deaths
British military personnel killed in the Battle of the Somme
England international rugby union players